Manolo Sanchez may refer to:

Manolo Sanchez (Nixon's valet) (born 1930), long-time valet to Richard Nixon
Manolo Sánchez (footballer, born 1969), Spanish footballer
Manolo Sánchez (footballer, born 1976), Spanish footballer
Manolo Sánchez (footballer, born 1991), Puerto Rican footballer